Communist Party of Nepal (Masal), initially known as Communist Party of Nepal (Unity Centre-Masal) (नेपाल कम्युनिष्ट पार्टी (एकताकेन्द्र–मसाल)), is an underground communist party in Nepal, which emerged in 2006 through a split in Communist Party of Nepal (Unity Centre-Masal). In March 2007, the party held a 7th Party Congress (counting the congresses of Communist Party of Nepal, Communist Party of Nepal (Fourth Convention), Communist Party of Nepal (Masal) and CPN(UC-M) as theirs). The congress reelected Mohan Bikram Singh as general secretary. Moreover, the congress removed 'Unity Centre' from the party name.

The legal mass front of the party is the Rashtriya Jana Morcha.

See also
 List of communist parties in Nepal

References

Cailmail, Benoît. Autumn 2008 – Spring 2009. "Mohan Bikram Singh and the History of Nepalese Maoism". European Bulletin of Himalayan Research. n° 33-34, pp. 11–38.

NCP Mashal Home Page

2006 establishments in Nepal
Communist parties in Nepal
International Coordination of Revolutionary Parties and Organizations
Political parties established in 2006